Zhao Rui may refer to:
 Zhao Rui (figure skater) (born 1991), Chinese pair skater
 Zhao Rui (basketball) (born 1996), Chinese basketball player